Parliamentary elections were held in Portugal on 28 August 1910. However, before the results were confirmed, a coup d'état overthrew the monarchy on 5 October. In 1911 a Constituent Assembly was elected the following year.

Results

References

Legislative elections in Portugal
Portugal
1910 elections in Portugal
August 1910 events